Mount Parker may refer to:

 Mount Parker, in the Admiralty Mountains of Antarctica
 Mount Parker (British Columbia), Canada
 Mount Parker (Nunavut), Canada
 Mount Parker Hynes (Nova Scotia), Canada
 Mount Parker (Hong Kong)
 Mount Parker (Philippines)
 Mount Parker (Alaska), USA
 Mount Parker (New Hampshire), USA